Texas Lawmen is a 1951 American Western film directed by Lewis D. Collins and starring Johnny Mack Brown, James Ellison and I. Stanford Jolley.

The film's sets were designed by the art directors Dave Milton and Vin Taylor.

Plot

Cast
Johnny Mack Brown as Marshal Johnny Mack Brown
James Ellison as Sheriff Tod Merrick
I. Stanford Jolley as Bart Morrow
Lee Roberts as Steve Morrow
Terry Frost as Henchman Ed Mason
Marshall Reed as U. S. Marshal Potter
Roy Bucko as Townsman
Roy Butler as Stage Agent
Cecil Combs as Townsman
John Hart as Marshal Dave
Al Haskell as Townsman
Jack Hendricks as Pete
Pierce Lyden as Sheriff Thorne
Post Park as 1st Stage Driver
Stanley Price as Mine Foreman
Lyle Talbot as Dr. Riley

References

External links

1951 Western (genre) films
American Western (genre) films
Films directed by Lewis D. Collins
Monogram Pictures films
Films scored by Raoul Kraushaar
American black-and-white films
Films with screenplays by Joseph F. Poland
1950s English-language films
1950s American films